Khomutovka is a rural locality (a village) in Dyomsky Selsoviet, Bizhbulyaksky District, Bashkortostan, Russia. The population was 245 as of 2010. There are 6 streets.

Geography 
Khomutovka is located 44 km south of Bizhbulyak (the district's administrative centre) by road. Naberezhny is the nearest rural locality.

References 

Rural localities in Bizhbulyaksky District